The Warsaw Cup is an annual international figure skating competition which is generally held in November in Warsaw, Poland. Its senior categories became part of the ISU Challenger Series in the 2014–15 season. Medals may be awarded in the disciplines of men's singles, ladies' singles, pair skating, and ice dancing. The event's junior and novice categories were discontinued after 2013.

Senior medalists 
CS: ISU Challenger Series

Men

Women

Pairs

Ice dance

Junior medalists

Men

Ladies

Pairs

Ice dancing

Novice medalists

Men

Ladies

Pairs

References

External links
 Polish Figure Skating Association

 
ISU Challenger Series
International figure skating competitions hosted by Poland
Sports competitions in Warsaw
Autumn events in Poland